Fatal Microbes were an English punk rock band formed in 1978. The main line-up of the band consisted of Honey Bane on vocals, Gem Stone on drums, Pete Fender on guitar and Scotty Barker on bass.

The band's name is regarded as a reference to the theme of disgust and toxicity, explored and embraced by many punk rock acts in the late 1970s and early 1980.

History
In 1979 Small Wonder and XNTRIX Records co-released a split 12-inch EP entitled "Violence Grows", which also featured the Epping-based Poison Girls (whose singer, Vi Subversa, was also mother to Gem Stone and Pete Fender). In the same year Fatal Microbes released a 7-inch single featuring "Violence Grows" on the punk rock record label Small Wonder Records. The single was championed by British DJ and radio presenter John Peel.

Honey Bane later had a career as a solo artist, a film and stage actress and a model. Pete Fender subsequently went on to form Rubella Ballet with Gem Stone (bass) and Sid Ation (drums). Fender later released a 7-inch EP, "Four Formulas", under his own name on XNTRIX records. Fender and ‘It’ had formed the band Punktuation in 1977. With an average age of 13 years, they were amongst the youngest punk bands in the country at the time.
Scott Barker went on to become a founder member of the legendary 'Old Reenies' (sometimes spelt 'Ol Rene's') with former Sods front man Kevin Jones and former No Warning guitarist Martin Brown. Scott Barker now lives in Spain and continues to perform.

The band's songs were included in the compilation album for Rip It Up and Start Again compilation released in 2006 through V2 Records.

Former members
Main line-up
 Honey Bane – vocals
 Gem Stone (Gemma Sansom) – drums
 Pete Fender (Dan Sansom) – guitar
 Scotty Boy Barker (Scott Barker) – bass

Other former members
 It (Quentin North) – bass

Discography
Singles
 "Violence Grows" (1979; split single with Poison Girls)
 "Violence Grows b/w Beautiful Pictures + Cry Baby" (Small Wonder Records 1979)

References

External links
 

English punk rock groups
English post-punk music groups
Musical quartets
Musical groups established in 1978
Musical groups disestablished in 1979